This is a list of notable Slovenian physicists.

A 
 Miroslav Adlešič

B 
 Robert Blinc (1933 - 2011)
 Silvo Breskvar (1902 - 1969)

C 

 Andrej Čadež - astrophysicist.
 Lavo Čermelj (1889 - 1980)

G 
 Peter Gosar (1923 - )

K 
 Ignacij Klemenčič (1853 - 1901)
 Alojz Kodre (1944 - )

P 
 Matjaž Perc (1979 - )
 Anton Peterlin (1908 - 1993) -
 Rudolf Podgornik (1955 - )
 Herman Potočnik Noordung (1892 - 1929) - pioneer of astronautics and cosmonautics, and rocket engineer.
 Tomaž Prosen (1970 - )

S 
 Jožef Stefan (1835 - 1893) - physicist, mathematician and poet.
 Janez Strnad (1934 - 2015) - physicist and populariser of natural science.

T 
 Gašper Tkačik (1979 -)

V 
 Jurij Bartolomej Vega (1754 - 1802) - mathematician, physicist and artillery officer

Z 
 Danilo Zavrtanik (1953 - )

See also
 Physicist
 List of Slovenians

Physicists
Physicists, Slovenian
List